Stefan Stojanović (born 27 Јuly 2001) is a Serbian footballer who plays as a forward for Rad.

Club career 

Stefan Stojanovic was born in Foča in Bosnia and Herzegovina and started training football at local club Sutjeska Foča. After playing for the youth selections of Sutjeska Foča, Stojanović joined Partizan in 2013 as a 12-year-old trainee. At age 15 he joined FK Dif. Later he was with Zvezdara for one season.
Stojanović signed his first professional contract with Rad in 2021.

Gallery

References

External links 
 Stefan Stojanović profile at sofacore.com
 Stefan Stojanović at Soccerway
 Stefan Stojanović FK Zvezdara
 Stefan Stojanović FK Rad
 Stefan Stojanović FK Rad
 Stefan Stojanović HIGHLIGHTS VIDEO

2001 births
Living people
People from Foča
Serbian footballers
Association football forwards
Association football wingers
FK Rad players
FK Zvezdara players